Alejandro Fernández Álvarez (born 30 May 1976) is a Spanish politician and political scientist who has been the leader of the People's Party of Catalonia since 2018.

Early life
Born in Tarragona to a lorry driver father and domestic worker mother, Fernández graduated in Political Science and Administration at the Autonomous University of Barcelona. He was a professor at Rovira i Virgili University in Tarragona, and in 2013 campaigned for it to be renamed "Tarragona University" instead of after the Catalan republican Antoni Rovira i Virgili.

Political career
He joined the youth division of the People's Party at 14 and was a city councillor in Tarragona for 13 years from 2003, leading the party in the city from 2008. In 2011 he was elected to the Congress of Deputies, leaving in 2015 when elected to the Parliament of Catalonia.

During his 2011 mayoral campaign, Fernández recorded a jingle to the tune of Lady Gaga's "Alejandro". It was withdrawn after legal threats from Sony/ATV Music Publishing.

In November 2018, he succeeded Xavier García Albiol as party leader upon the latter's resignation, with 97.1% of the votes.

In his campaign for the 2021 Catalan election, Fernández proposed ending Catalonia's separate police and judicial system, ending the region's public-private diplomacy consortium DiploCat ("partisan propaganda with public money"), and ensuring neutrality of TV3, Catalunya Ràdio and universities.

References

1976 births
Living people
People from Tarragona
People's Party (Spain) politicians
Leaders of political parties in Spain
Autonomous University of Barcelona alumni
Spanish political scientists
21st-century Spanish politicians